When We Rise is an eight-part American docudrama miniseries about the history of LGBT rights advocacy in the United States from the 1970s to the 2010s. It was created by Dustin Lance Black and stars Guy Pearce, Rachel Griffiths, Mary-Louise Parker, Michael Kenneth Williams, Austin P. McKenzie, Emily Skeggs, Jonathan Majors, Fiona Dourif, and Sam Jaeger among 30 others. The miniseries premiered on ABC on February 27, 2017, with the rest of its episodes airing March 1 to 3.

Plot
Based on the memoirs of LGBT activist Cleve Jones, When We Rise chronicles the personal and political struggles, set-backs, and triumphs of a diverse group of LGBTQ+ individuals who helped pioneer a portion of the civil rights movement from its infancy in the 20th century to the successes of today. The 41-year saga (1972-2013) tells the evolving history of the modern gay rights movement, starting just after the Stonewall riots in 1969.

Cast

 Guy Pearce as Cleve Jones, LGBT activist
 Austin P. McKenzie as young Cleve Jones
 Mary-Louise Parker as Roma Guy, activist
 Emily Skeggs as young Roma Guy
 Rachel Griffiths as Diane Jones, Roma's girlfriend (later wife)
 Fiona Dourif as young Diane Jones
 Carrie Preston as Sally Miller Gearhart, activist, teacher, and writer
 Michael K. Williams as Ken Jones, activist
 Jonathan Majors as young Ken Jones
 Jack Plotnick as Gilbert Baker, designer of the rainbow flag
 Dylan Arnold as young Gilbert Baker
 Ivory Aquino as Cecilia Chung, transgender activist
 Kevin McHale as Bobbi Campbell, AIDS activist
 Dylan Walsh as Dr. Marcus Conant, pioneer in the diagnosis and treatment of AIDS
 Rafael de la Fuente as Ricardo Canto, Cleve's partner
 Caitlin Gerard as Jean, Roma's first girlfriend in San Francisco 
 Nick Eversman as Scott Rempel, Cleve's friend in San Francisco who gives his job to Cleve when he leaves for Europe
 Whoopi Goldberg as Pat Norman, the first openly gay employee of the San Francisco Health Department
 Rosie O'Donnell as Del Martin, co-founder of Daughters of Bilitis, the first lesbian civil and political rights organization in the United States
 Maddie Corman as Phyllis Lyon, Del Martin's girlfriend (later wife), fellow activist and co-founder of Daughters of Bilitis
 Denis O'Hare as Jim Foster, an openly gay Democratic party organizer
 David Hyde Pierce as Dr. Jones, Cleve's father
 T. R. Knight as Chad Griffin
 Sam Jaeger as Richard, Ken Jones' long-term partner
 Todd Weeks as Tom Ammiano
 Matthew Del Negro as Gavin Newsom
 Justin Sams as Sylvester
 Alexandra Grey as Seville
 Willam Belli as Jason
 Michael DeLorenzo as José Sarria
 Richard Schiff as Judge Vaughn Walker
 Charlie Carver as Michael Smith, Ken Jones' early partner
 Rob Reiner as David Blankenhorn
 Pauley Perrette as Robin
 William Sadler as Chuck Cooper
 Charles Socarides, Jr. as Richard Socarides
 John Rubinstein as Dr. Charles W. Socarides
 Phylicia Rashad as Bishop Yvette A. Flunder
 Jazzmun as Bobbi Jean Baker
 Mary McCormack as Roberta A. Kaplan
 Arliss Howard as Ted Olson
 Henry Czerny as David Boies
 Balthazar Getty as David
 Tyler Young as Matt

Episodes

Notes

Production

Filming
The series is eight hours long in seven parts. Gus Van Sant directed the first two-hour part, Dee Rees parts two and three, Thomas Schlamme parts four and five, and Black parts six and seven. The series is partially inspired by LGBT activist Cleve Jones's memoir When We Rise: My Life in the Movement. Van Sant and Black previously collaborated on Milk, which likewise featured Cleve Jones as a major character.

Casting
On March 15, 2016, Carrie Preston was cast as Sally Gearhart. Guy Pearce as Cleve Jones, Mary-Louise Parker as Roma Guy, Rachel Griffiths as Diane, Michael K. Williams as Ken Jones, Ivory Aquino as Cecilia Chung, Kevin McHale as Bobbi Campbell, Dylan Walsh as Dr. Marcus Conant, Rafael de la Fuente as Ricardo, Austin P. McKenzie as young Cleve Jones, Emily Skeggs as young Roma Guy, Jonathan Majors as young Ken Jones, Fiona Dourif as young Diane, Whoopi Goldberg as Pat Norman, Rosie O'Donnell as Del Martin, Denis O'Hare as Jim Foster, and David Hyde Pierce as Cleve's father, Dr. Jones, were cast on April 26, 2016, respectively.

On June 22, 2016, T. R. Knight was cast as Chad Griffin and Richard Schiff as Judge Vaughn Walker. Rob Reiner, Pauley Perrette, William Sadler, Phylicia Rashad, Alexandra Grey, Mary McCormack, Arliss Howard, and Henry Czerny were booked as guest stars.  Charlie Carver was cast as Michael on November 21, 2016.

Music
Chris Bacon and Danny Elfman composed the music for the miniseries with various artists, and the soundtrack album is now released at Hollywood Records, Inc and iTunes.

Broadcast
The TV miniseries premiered on ABC on February 27, 2017 at 9 p.m. EST. Originally scheduled to air nightly until March 2, the scheduling was later shifted to accommodate live coverage of the address to a joint session of Congress by President Donald Trump on February 28; the first episode remained scheduled to air on February 27, with the remaining three episodes airing from March 1 to 3.

Reception

Critical response
Review aggregator Rotten Tomatoes gives the series an approval rating of 82% based on 34 reviews, with an average rating of 6.70/10. The site's critical consensus reads, "When We Rise works as a well-meaning outreach project with a decent cast, even if the script's ambitious reach slightly exceeds its grasp." On Metacritic, the series has a score of 67 out of 100, based on 24 critics, indicating "generally favorable reviews".

Daniel Fienberg of The Hollywood Reporter wrote in his review of the first part of the miniseries: "In a film festival environment, in which stories of otherness and barrier-breaking are part of the expected tapestry, When We Rise might play as a bit quaint, muted and smoothed out for mainstream audiences, which it very clearly is. But even in 2017, when we like to think that boundaries have been pushed a fair amount and that the voices being heard are as diverse as ever, When We Rise feels like a rather astounding thing to find on network TV."

James Poniewozik of The New York Times wrote in his review: "When We Rise, ABC's sweeping four-night history of the gay rights movement, is a rebuttal. As a television drama, it often plays like a high-minded, dutiful educational video. But at its best moments, it's also a timely statement that identity is not just an abstraction but a matter of family, livelihood, life and death."

Greg Braxton of the Los Angeles Times wrote in his review: "It could've been a scene from any of the recent protests that have arisen in the stormy first weeks of the Donald Trump presidency. But peering closer—at the '70s garb, the cameras recording the scene—reveals that this was a re-creation of another, similarly tumultuous, time. [...] The writer-director is still optimistic that When We Rise will appeal to a mainstream audience—including Trump supporters—because of its focus on family, emotion and perseverance."

Danette Chavez of The A.V. Club wrote in her review: "When We Rise isn't laboring in another production's shadow, though; instead, it tries very hard to bring all of those moments and history makers to light. This is obviously a huge undertaking, one that traces the converging paths of gay activists who thwarted Prop 6, were later devastated by the rise of AIDS, but then rallied back to win marriage equality in 2015. Those battles weren't all fought by the exact same people, which pushes the scope of the miniseries even further. But a central trio of characters anchors the story, which runs through four decades (1971 to 2015, roughly)."

When We Rise received a nomination for Best Miniseries at the 2018 Satellite Awards and won the GLAAD Media Award for Outstanding TV Movie or Limited Series at the 29th GLAAD Media Awards.

Historical accuracy

Although there were some non-factual elements, Cleve Jones (one of the principal gay activists depicted) stated that the small, factual changes Black and his team made to the 50-year history of specific characters and events portrayed do not dilute the overall truthfulness and realness of the miniseries. Black spent four years researching and writing the script, consulting as many of the real life figures as possible and many of the actors were able to meet with the individuals they portrayed. The episodes often contain archival footage of actual events.

References

External links
 
 
 When We Rise on Dustin Lance Black's website

2010s American documentary television series
2010s American drama television miniseries
2010s American LGBT-related drama television series
2017 American television series debuts
2017 American television series endings
American Broadcasting Company original programming
American television docudramas
English-language television shows
Gay-related television shows
HIV/AIDS in television
Lesbian-related television shows
LGBT rights movement
Television series by ABC Studios
Television series set in the 1960s
Television series set in the 1970s
Television series set in the 1990s
Television series set in the 2000s
Transgender-related television shows
Bisexuality-related television series
Documentaries about LGBT topics